Puneeth Rajkumar was an Indian actor cum singer who worked in Kannada films.

References

Lists of songs recorded by Indian singers